Kiitos ei ole kirosana is the fifth studio album of the Finnish pop rock band Haloo Helsinki!. The album debuted at number one on the Finnish Albums Chart.

Track listing

Charts

See also
List of number-one albums of 2014 (Finland)

References

2014 albums
Haloo Helsinki! albums
Finnish-language albums